The geography of Gujarat state of India includes following:

Mountain ranges
Vindhya  
Western Ghats
Satpura range 
Aravali range

Hills

Chotila 
Pavagadh 
Palitana 
Saputara
Girnar
Bardo
Gabbar

Rivers

Narmada 
Tapi 
Mahi 
Sabarmati 
West Banas 
Shetrunji
Bhadar
Aji 
Ghela 
Rukmavati 
Vishwamitri 
Damanganga

Ecoregions
According to the WWF, Gujarat covers portions of five terrestrial ecoregions:
 The Indus River Delta–Arabian Sea mangroves are found in tidal areas bordering the Gulf of Kutch and Gulf of Khambat, as well as in the Indus River Delta of neighboring Sind province of Pakistan.

 Khathiar–Gir dry deciduous forests cover the eastern portion of the state, extending into adjacent portions of Rajasthan and Madhya Pradesh, with a pocket on the peak of Girnar in the central Kathiawar. The natural vegetation is a dry deciduous forest with trees up to 25 meters in height, with areas of thorn scrub. The vegetation has been much altered by centuries of intensive agriculture and grazing. 
 The North Western Ghats moist deciduous forests cover the Western Ghats range in the extreme southeastern portion of Gujarat. The natural vegetation are diverse multistoried rain forests with trees of up to 45 meters in height, along with understory herbs, shrubs and trees, lianas, and ephiphytes.
 Northwestern thorn scrub forests cover the Kathiawar Peninsula and the upland portion of Kutch District, extending north into Rajasthan. The natural vegetation is open thorn scrub.
 The Rann of Kutch is a large seasonal salt marsh in the northwestern portion of Gujarat.

Beaches
Umbharat Beach - Jalalpore Ubharat Beach is situated on the coastline of the state of Gujarat and is one of the finest beaches of India in Navsari District of Gujarat . It comes into Jalalpore Taluka. It is located on the coast of the Gulf of Khambhat, Arabian Sea of Indian Ocean at a distance of 34 km from Jalalpore. and 33 km away from Navsari City, in Navsari District. It is 40 km away from the city of Surat.

Dandi Beach - Jalalpore Dandi Beach is situated on the coastline of the state of Gujarat and is one of the finest beaches of India in Navsari District of Gujarat . It comes into Jalalpore Taluka. It is located on the coast of the Gulf of Khambhat, Arabian Sea of Indian Ocean at a distance of 15 km from Jalalpore. and 31 km and 22 km away from Bilimora and Navsari City of Navsari District. It is 49 km away from the city of Surat.

Ahmedpur Mandvi Beach - Ahmedpur Mandvi Beach is situated on the coastline of the state of Gujarat and is one of the finest beaches in India. It is in Ahmedpur Mandvi, close to Diu Union Territory.

Mandvi Beach - Kutch - Mandvi Wind Farms Beach and Wind-mills, which line the horizon of Mandvi, offer views from the Mandvi sea-beach. The Wind mills projects running in this beach was Asia's 1st Wind-Mills Projects in 1983.

Chorwad Beach - Chorwad Beach of Gujarat is another beach situated on the west coast of India. It is situated at a distance of 66 km from Junagadh. Chorwad has a high potential of attracting both domestic as well as international tourists. The beach consists of rocky hills and presents an opportunity for boat rides.

Diu Beach - Diu beach is situated on the island of Diu, off the Saurashtra coast Diu has a small population, and is connected to the mainland of Gujarat via a causeway.

Gopnath Beach - Gopnath Beach is situated in the Bhavnagar district of Gujarat. It comes into Talaja Taluka. It is located on the coast of the Gulf of Kambhat, at a distance of 75 km from the city of Bhavnagar. and 22 km. away from Talaja. The Fort of the King of Gohilvad is situated in Gopnath.

Kutch Mandvi Beach — Kutch Mandvi is an important beach in Gujarat, situated at Mandvi. Mandvi is the historic port town of Maharao of Kutch, located at a distance of 75 km from Bhuj. Kutch Mandvi was once inhabited by the Maharao of Kutch and was an important seaport.

Umbergam Beach - Umargam is about 6 km from Umargam Road railway station on Mumbai-Surat rail section. This region was a part of Thane district prior to the creation of Gujarat in 1960.

Umargam is situated on the southern bank of Nargol creek. It was a small village about two centuries ago, serving as a transit point for exporting marine produce from the fishing port Nargol on the Northern Bank of the creek.

Madhavpur Beach - Madhavpur Ghed Beach is on Porbandar-Veraval Highway and residing in Porbadar. It is a well-known tourist attraction with high current tides reaching the shores with deadly speed and establishes various local facilities, may it be camel rides or stalls of baked corn. Due to severe high currents, beach activities during monsoon seasons are limited.

 Tithal Beach (Valsad) - Tithal beach is 5 km from Valsad.

References